Catephia sciras is a species of moth of the  family Erebidae. It is found in eastern Africa in Kenya.

References
Fawcett, J. M. 1916. Notes on a collection of Heterocera made by Mr. W. Feather in British East Africa, 1911–13. - Proceedings of the Zoological Society of London 2:707–737, pl. 1.

External links

Endemic moths of Kenya
Catephia
Moths of Africa
Moths described in 1916